Gary Larsen (born March 13, 1942) is a former American football defensive tackle who played in the National Football League (NFL). He played college football at Concordia College. He started his NFL career in 1964 with the Los Angeles Rams and then became a  part of the famous Purple People Eaters for the Minnesota Vikings from 1965 through 1974.  He was selected to two Pro Bowls and played in Super Bowls IV, VIII and IX.

He was known as the "policeman", the player who covered the run while Eller, Marshall, and Page attacked the quarterback. According to Minnesota Vikings records, he made 38.5 sacks in his 11-year career.

External links
Gary Larsen at NFL Vikings

1942 births
Living people
American football defensive linemen
Concordia Cobbers football players
Los Angeles Rams players
Minnesota Vikings players
Western Conference Pro Bowl players
National Conference Pro Bowl players
Sportspeople from Fargo, North Dakota